The Journal of Endodontics (JOE) is the official journal of the American Association of Endodontists and is published by Elsevier. It is a monthly journal that was established in 1975 and publishes scientific articles, case reports, and studies comparing different tools, materials, and methods used in endodontic treatment.

According to the Journal Citation Reports, Journal of Endodontics has a 2020 impact factor of 4.171, ranking it 16th out of 91 in the category Dentistry, Oral Surgery & Medicine.

References

External links
 Journal of Endodontics
 
 American Association of Endodontists

Monthly journals
Dentistry journals
Elsevier academic journals
Publications established in 1975
English-language journals